Strang is a town in Mayes County, Oklahoma, United States. The population was 100 at the 2000 census.

Geography
Strang is located at  (36.411225, -95.133075).

Demographics

As of the 2010 census Strang had a population of 89.  The racial composition of the population was 60.7% white, 32.6% Native American and 6.7% reporting two or more races.

As of the census of 2000, there were 100 people, 43 households, and 27 families residing in the town. There were 54 housing units at an average density of 190.2 per square mile (74.5/km2). The racial makeup of the town was 66.00% White, 21.00% Native American, and 13.00% from two or more races. Hispanic or Latino of any race were 4.00% of the population.

There were 43 households, out of which 20.9% had children under the age of 18 living with them, 51.2% were married couples living together, 7.0% had a female householder with no husband present, and 37.2% were non-families. 37.2% of all households were made up of individuals, and 23.3% had someone living alone who was 65 years of age or older. The average household size was 2.33 and the average family size was 2.96.

In the town, the population was spread out, with 29.0% under the age of 18, 3.0% from 18 to 24, 25.0% from 25 to 44, 25.0% from 45 to 64, and 18.0% who were 65 years of age or older. The median age was 40 years.

The median income for a household in the town was $14,792, and the median income for a family was $25,000. Males had a median income of $31,875 versus $25,625 for females. The per capita income for the town was $12,676. There were 16.7% of families and 18.8% of the population living below the poverty line, including 30.8% of those over 64.

References

Towns in Mayes County, Oklahoma
Towns in Oklahoma